Bishopric of Thyatira is a titular see of the Roman Catholic Church centered on the ancient Roman city of Thyatira in Asia Minor.

The bishopric of Thyatira stretched back to very early Christianity. Christianity came to the region in the mid 1st century with Paul the Apostle on his Third missionary journey around 54AD, when he stayed for three years in nearby Ephesus. Timothy, Onesimus and John were all active in the area and The Christian community here was addressed by letter of John as it is one of the Seven churches of Revelation.

The diocese was in the ecclesiastical province of Sardis.

By the 3rd century, almost the entire town was Christian in religion but a stronghold of the Montanist sect.

Known bishops

List of archbishops of Thyateira and Great Britain 
 Germanos Strenopoulos (1922—1951)
 Athenagoras Kavadas (1951—1962)
 Athenagoras Kokkinakis (1963—1979)
 Methodios Fouyias (1979—1988)
 Gregorios Theocharous (from 1988)

See also
 Greek Orthodox Archdiocese of Thyateira and Great Britain.

References

External links
 Entry Giga-Catholic
 Apostolische Nachfolge – Titularsitze

Catholic titular sees in Asia